Pierre Lacour, originally Delacour (15 April 1745 - 28 January 1814) was a French painter.

Biography
His first artistic studies were in the workshop of the engraver, André Lavau (1722-1808). In 1764, he went to Paris to continue his studies with the painter, Joseph-Marie Vien. He was awarded second place in the Prix de Rome of 1769. Two years later, he was named an Academician.

In 1778, he married Catherine Chauvet. Documents from that time give his occupation as "history painter". During the Revolution, he was a drawing teacher at the École centrale and maintained the old municipal drawing school at his personal expense.

His first exhibit at the Salon came in 1796; the same year he was named a corresponding member of the Académie des beaux-arts. Three years later, he was elected to the Academy of Sciences.. In 1801, he founded the Musée des beaux-arts de Bordeaux and became its first Curator. In 1803, he became a Professor and, from 1804 until his death, served as the Director of the School of Painting and Design.

In addition, he was placed in charge of restoring the Palais Rohan. His many students included Pierre-Nolasque Bergeret, Jean Alaux and Jean-Bruno Gassies. Upon his death, his son, also named Pierre Lacour, succeeded him as Curator of the museum.

Works

Achilles Deposits Hector's Corpse at the Feet of Patroclus (1769), École nationale supérieure des Beaux-Arts
St. Roch displayed in 1776
Arrivée du comtte d'Estaing à Brest (Arrival of Comté d'Estaing in Brest), displayed at the Salon in 1782
Reunited Portrait of Judges and Consuls of Bordeaux in 1786 (Portraits réunis des juges et consuls de la Bourse de Bordeaux), displayed in 1787
Ambassador Sully in London (Ambassade de Sully à Londres), displayed in 1787
Étienne de Baecque
Portrait of Mme. Pierre Guibert
Works in the Musée des beaux-arts de Bordeaux:
L’Artiste peignant un portrait de famille
Vue d'une partie du port et des quais de Bordeaux : dit Les Chartrons et Bacalan (View of the Some Ports and Quays in Bordeaux: Les Chartrans and Bacalan)
Portrait de Pierre Lacour fils (Portrait of Pierre Lacour, Junior) (1778-1859)
Cléopâtre se désolant dans le tombeau de Marc-Antoine (1781)
Château de Versailles and Trianon: René-Augustin de Maupeou (1714-1792), chancellor of France

Notes

Sources

 Robert Mesuret, Pierre Lacour, 1745-1814, published by Delmas (Bordeaux) 1937
 Pierre Lacour, notes and memories of an octogenarian artist, 1778-1798, edition prepared by Philippe Le Leyzour and Dominque Cant, Museum of Fine Arts in Bordeaux and William Blake publishers, Périgueux, Fanlac 1989, 

1745 births
1814 deaths
18th-century French painters
French male painters
19th-century French painters
Prix de Rome for painting
French expatriates in Italy
Artists from Bordeaux
19th-century French male artists
18th-century French male artists